This article shows statistics of individual players for the football club Dinamo Zagreb It also lists all matches that Dinamo Zagreb played in the 2003–04 season.

Squad 
(Correct as of November 2003)

Transfers

Summer 
Incoming

Outgoing

Competitions

Overall

Prva HNL

Classification

Results summary

Results by round

Results by opponent 

Source: 2003–04 Prva HNL article

Matches

Competitive

External links 
 2003–04 in Croatian Football at Rec.Sport.Soccer Statistics Foundation
 2003–04 season at Prva HNL official website 
 Dinamo Zagreb Official website 

GNK Dinamo Zagreb seasons
Dinamo Zagreb